The 1952 German Grand Prix was a Formula Two race held on 3 August 1952 at the  Nürburgring Nordschleife. It was race 6 of 8 in the 1952 World Championship of Drivers, in which each Grand Prix was run to Formula Two rules rather than the Formula One regulations normally used. The 18-lap race was won by Ferrari driver Alberto Ascari after he started from pole position. His teammates Giuseppe Farina and Rudi Fischer finished in second and third places.

Report 
The Maserati factory team finally appeared with their new car, the A6GCM, which was driven by Felice Bonetto. Also racing A6GCMs were the Escuderia Bandeirantes drivers Bianco and Cantoni. Ferrari once again entered the successful trio of Alberto Ascari, Nino Farina and Piero Taruffi, while there were privateer Ferrari entries for Rudi Fischer and Rudolf Schoeller of Ecurie Espadon, Roger Laurent of Ecurie Francorchamps, and Piero Carini of Scuderia Marzotto. Jean Behra returned to action for the Gordini team, having recovered from his shoulder injury. He replaced Prince Bira, and was partnered by teammates Robert Manzon and Maurice Trintignant. HWM entered three cars, with regular Peter Collins joined by the Belgian pairing of Paul Frère and Johnny Claes, while Australian Tony Gaze drove a privateer HWM. Bill Aston drove an Aston Butterworth, and the field was completed by a plethora of privateer German cars (Veritas, AFM and BMW).

Ferrari were once again fastest in qualifying, with Ascari and Farina being joined on the front row of the grid by the Gordinis of Trintignant and Manzon. The remaining works Ferrari driver, Taruffi, started from the second row, alongside the Ecurie Espadon-entered Ferrari of Fischer and Paul Pietsch in a Veritas. Bonetto's works Maserati made the third row, along with the Gordini of Jean Behra, and a pair of local entrants: Hans Klenk's Veritas, and Willi Heeks in an AFM.

The race turned out to be rather a processional event, with Ascari leading Farina all the way in the first 16 laps. Two laps from home, he had to dive into the pits for oil, emerging 10 seconds behind Farina-which he rattled off on the next lap, catching Farina just a mile from home to win by several seconds after an otherwise dull race. Piero Taruffi had been running in third behind his teammates, but he lost the position to Rudi Fischer towards the end of the race when he encountered problems due to his suspension breaking. Fischer's podium and Taruffi's fourth place-finish ensured that it was a Ferrari 1-2-3-4. Manzon, who had been running in fourth for much of the first half of the race, between Taruffi and Fischer, was forced to retire when a wheel fell off his car. This meant that his teammate Behra was left to take the final points in fifth position in his Gordini, ahead of Roger Laurent's Ferrari. Felice Bonetto, of the factory Maserati team, was disqualified for receiving a push start after his first lap spin.

Ascari, who had taken his fourth consecutive victory, along with a fourth consecutive fastest lap, had now scored the maximum of 36 points for the season, as only a driver's four best results counted. As a result, he clinched the world championship, making him the first driver to win the championship with two races left to go. The date was 3 August, the earliest anyone would claim the Championship until Jim Clark seized the crown on 1 August in 1965, also at the Nürburgring. Ascari's teammates, Taruffi and Farina, remained in second and third, respectively, in the Drivers' Championship, while Swiss driver Fischer's second podium of the season raised him up to fourth in the standings.

Entries

Classification

Qualifying

Only the lap times from the 7 best placed drivers are known.

Race

Notes
 – Includes 1 point for fastest lap

Championship standings after the race 
Drivers' Championship standings

Note: Only the top five positions are included. Only the best 4 results counted towards the Championship.

References

German Grand Prix
German Grand Prix
German Grand Prix
Sport in Rhineland-Palatinate
Ger